The Lost Recipe is a 2021 Philippine television drama series broadcast by GMA News TV and GTV. It aired from January 18, 2021 to March 31, 2021 on the network's evening line up and worldwide via GMA Pinoy TV.

Series overview

Episodes
             

Episodes notes

References

Lists of Philippine drama television series episodes